Shenandoah is a 1965 American Western film set during the American Civil War (but not a war film) starring James Stewart and featuring Doug McClure, Glenn Corbett, Patrick Wayne, and, in their film debuts, Katharine Ross and Rosemary Forsyth. The picture was directed by Andrew V. McLaglen. The American folk song "Oh Shenandoah" features prominently in the film's soundtrack.

Though set during the Civil War, the film's strong antiwar and humanitarian themes resonated with audiences in later years as attitudes began to change against the Vietnam War. Upon its release, the film was praised for its themes as well as its technical production.

Plot
In the Commonwealth of Virginia in 1864, during the Civil War, family patriarch Charlie Anderson (James Stewart) and his six sons Jacob, John, James, Nathan, Henry, and Boy (who is 16) run the family farm, while his daughter Jennie (Rosemary Forsyth) and daughter-in-law Ann (Katharine Ross) take care of the housework. The family has no slaves. Though Charlie attends church weekly and considers himself a "God fearing" man, he doesn't give God credit for anything, but takes credit for himself especially during dinner prayer. He internally blames God for taking his wife from him. His family is constantly late for church and will force people out of their seats to make room for his family, much to the annoyance of the preacher and congregation.

Charlie's oldest son Jacob (Glenn Corbett) wants to join the war, but Charlie repeatedly tells his family that they won't join the war until it concerns them. Although a few of the boys want to join, they respect their father's wishes and remain on the farm. Charlie's daughter Jennie is courted by a young Confederate officer named Sam (Doug McClure). He wants to marry Jennie, and when Charlie gives his permission, the wedding occurs a few days later. As soon as the vows are said, a corporal rides up and announces that Sam is wanted back immediately. Sam leaves, much to the sorrow of his new bride. Shortly after Sam leaves Ann goes into labor, giving birth to a baby girl whom they name Martha in honor of Charlie's late wife.

While out hunting raccoon, Charlie's youngest son Boy (Phillip Alford) and his friend Gabriel (Eugene Jackson Jr.) stumble onto a Confederate ambush. They run away and stop for a drink at a pond. Boy is wearing an old rebel soldier kepi cap that he found at the river. When a Union patrol comes on them, they take Boy as a prisoner of war, mistakenly thinking he is a rebel soldier. Gabriel, who has been told he is free by a black union soldier, runs to tell the Andersons what happened and then heads out on his own. When Charlie hears the news, he and his sons and daughter Jennie leave to look for Boy, leaving James (Patrick Wayne) and his wife Ann at the farm with their young baby.

The first place the Andersons look is a Union camp. They are told there are no prisoners there, but Colonel Fairchild (George Kennedy), who also has a sixteen-year-old son, directs them to a possible location, where Confederate prisoners are shipped North via railroad. However, the captain in charge at the train deport refuses to allow Charlie to look through the cars, as he "has schedules to keep". So Charlie sets up a roadblock on the tracks, then disarms the Union guards and sends them away. He looks through the boxcars, but Boy is not there, so he mounts his horse to leave. As he looks up, he sees Sam coming through the crowd. Jennie is overjoyed to see her husband. Sam leaves with the Andersons, telling the soldiers to burn the train and go home knowing there's no chance of winning the war.

After being taken to a different prisoner of war camp, Boy is befriended by rebel soldier Carter (James Best), who plans to escape and decides to let Boy come along. They and a few other men successfully escape while being loaded on a paddle wheeler and start heading south. They come onto a Confederate camp and the next day are attacked by the Federals. Carter is killed, and Boy is shot in the leg. A Union soldier almost kills him, but it turns out to be his friend, Gabriel who has joined the Union Army. Gabriel helps him hide in a bush until after the battle.

Back at the farm, three Confederate scavengers raid the place, killing James before attacking and killing Ann. On their way home, the Andersons run across a Confederate unit guarding the road. A young sentry, startled awake by the sound of horses, takes a shot at Jacob, killing him instantly. Charlie starts to strangle the sentry, but stops to ask him his age. The sentry replies, "Sixteen, sir." Charlie, remembering that his youngest son is sixteen, emotionally tells the sentry that he wants him to live and be an old man and have many sons. He wants him to know what it feels like to lose one of them. The sentry then weeps in guilt.

When the Andersons return home, the doctor tells them what happened to James and Ann. Their child Martha is still alive, with a black woman acting as her nanny, and Charlie takes her in his arms. Next day at the breakfast table, Charlie begins his standard prayer, but is so heartbroken that he can't finish it. He goes out to the family graveyard to see his wife's grave. He sees the graves of James, Jacob and Ann alongside hers, and he hears church bells ringing in the distance.

At the farmhouse, he demands to know why no one told him it was Sunday. The whole family gets dressed and ready for church, arriving as the singing begins. As the congregation completes the first song, the pastor (Denver Pyle) starts to announce the next hymn. Boy stumbles through the door on a crutch. The whole congregation looks, and Charlie Anderson turns to see what is happening. His face lights up, and he helps his son to the pew. Everyone joyously sings in unison as the story ends.

Cast 

 James Stewart as Charlie Anderson
 Doug McClure as Sam
 Glenn Corbett as Jacob Anderson
 Patrick Wayne as James Anderson
 Phillip Alford as Boy Anderson
 Katharine Ross as Ann Anderson
 Rosemary Forsyth as Jennie Anderson
 Charles Robinson as Nathan Anderson
 James McMullan as John Anderson
 Tim McIntire as Henry Anderson
 Eugene Jackson, Jr. as Gabriel
 Paul Fix as Dr. Tom Witherspoon
 Denver Pyle as Pastor Bjoerling
 George Kennedy as Col. Fairchild
 James Best as Carter (rebel soldier)
 Tom Simcox as Lt. Johnson
 Berkeley Harris as Capt. Richards
 Harry Carey Jr. as Jenkins (rebel soldier)
 Kevin Hagen as Mule (deserter)
 Dabbs Greer as Abernathy
 Strother Martin as Train Engineer
 Kelly Thordsen as Federal Purchasing Agent Carroll

Reception
Howard Thompson of The New York Times called the film "a pretty good Civil War drama" with Stewart "perfectly cast," though he thought it was "too long. Under the overly detailed direction of Andrew V. McLaglen, it hits and hangs onto many a static snag." Variety stated that "the Technicolor film, despite a neuter title, packs drama, excitement and an emotional quality certain National Parks particularly reflected in the climax — which should find better-than-average reception in the general market ... Stewart, seldom without a cigar butt in the corner of his mouth, endows his grizzled role with a warm conviction." Philip K. Scheuer of the Los Angeles Times called it "a curious film for this day and age, a kind of anachronistic throwback to the bucolic ... Nevertheless, it serves as a reminder of homely virtues and homilies, as spoken, mostly, by James Stewart. He creates a unique character and sustains it convincingly through stress and tragic change." Leo Sullivan of The Washington Post praised it as "an engrossing film with lots of heart and even a soul," adding, "Playing with splendid conviction, Stewart forgoes his usual tricks to gain sympathy for this widower who has raised six sons and an equally sturdy daughter. His performance is a thoughtful study in one man's attempt at neutrality." The Monthly Film Bulletin wrote, "Basically sentimental, the film even includes a scene where the longstanding but still sorrowing widower philosophizes about life over his wife's grave, but the treatment often has a freshness and humour which show that McLaglen has learned from his admiration for John Ford ... James Stewart, whose laconic drawl makes the dialogue sound funnier than it really is, gives one of the best performances of his career." The film was particularly successful at the box office within the state of Virginia, the movie's locale, where it broke records for ticket sales.  The film has a 100% rating on Rotten Tomatoes.

Awards
In 1966, the film was nominated for an Academy Award for Best Sound (Waldon O. Watson). For her part in Shenandoah, Rosemary Forsyth was nominated for a Golden Globe for Most Promising Newcomer - Female.

Adaptations
The film was adapted as a hit Broadway musical in 1975, which won John Cullum his first Tony Award for Best Actor.

Production notes
 Location scenes filmed near Eugene, Oregon
 Working titles: Fields of Honor and Shenandoah Crossing.
 The film broke box office records in Virginia, the story's locale.

References

External links 
 
 

1965 films
1965 Western (genre) films
American Civil War films
American Western (genre) films
Anti-war films
1960s English-language films
Films directed by Andrew McLaglen
Films set in Virginia
Films set in the 1860s
Universal Pictures films
Films about farmers
Films set on farms
Films shot in Oregon
Films scored by Frank Skinner
1960s political films
1965 war films
1960s historical films
American historical films
Films about deserters
1960s American films